Dronning Sophia Magdalena was an East Indiaman of the Danish Asiatic Company, constructed at Asiatisk Plads in 1747. The name was later transferred to another DAC East Indiaman, built Asiatisk Plads in 1762.

Construction
Dronning Sophia Magdalena was constructed at Asiatisk Plads in 1747. Her first name was Dronningen af Danmark. In 1752, it was changed to Dronning Sophia Magdalena. She was the sister ship of Fredensborg Slot.

DAC career

She sailed from Copenhagen on 15 December 1752, bound for Canton. She returned to Copenhagen on 14 July 1754.

Mate (styrmand) Johan Olivarius sailed from Copenhagen on 2 December 1755, bound for Tranquebar. The ship arrived back in Copenhagen on 22 May 1756.

Captaon Lars Swane sailed from Copenhagen on 8 November 1757, bound for Tranquebar. The voyage was delayed by storms and headwind. The expedition was also hit hard by decase and deaths. Swane was also hit by decease. Sronning Sophia Magdalena arrived back in Copenhagen on 24 May 1759. The value of the cargo was relatively low at approximately 185,000 Danish rigsdaler.

Fate
The ship is not mentioned after 1759. The name was later transferred to another DAC ship, built at Aisatisk Plads in 1762.

See also
 Cron Printz Christian (DAC ship)

References

Ships of the Danish Asiatic Company
Frigates of Denmark
Ships built in Copenhagen
1747 ships